Gossliwil is a former municipality in the district of Bucheggberg, in the canton of Solothurn, Switzerland.  On 1 January 2014 the former municipalities of Gossliwil, Tscheppach, Brügglen, Aetingen, Aetigkofen, Bibern (SO), Hessigkofen, Mühledorf (SO), Küttigkofen, Kyburg-Buchegg merged into the new municipality of Buchegg.

History
Gossliwil is first mentioned in 1246 as Gosseriswile.  In 1276 it was mentioned as Goselwyl.

Geography
Of this area,  or 59.8% is used for agricultural purposes, while  or 34.0% is forested. Of the rest of the land,  or 7.7% is settled (buildings or roads).

Of the built up area, housing and buildings made up 3.6% and transportation infrastructure made up 4.1%.  Out of the forested land, all of the forested land area is covered with heavy forests.  Of the agricultural land, 41.2% is used for growing crops and 17.5% is pastures.

The former municipality is located in the Bucheggberg district, on a plateau near the source of the Biberenbach river.

Coat of arms
The blazon of the municipal coat of arms is Gules a Garb Or issuant from a Mount of 3 Coupeaux Vert surrounded with three Cinquefoils of the second, one and two.

Demographics
Gossliwil had a population (as of 2011) of 194.  , 1.5% of the population are resident foreign nationals.  Over the last 10 years (1999–2009 ) the population has changed at a rate of -1.5%.

Most of the population speaks German (183 or 97.3%), with Albanian being second most common (4 or 2.1%) and Portuguese being third (1 or 0.5%).

, the gender distribution of the population was 49.7% male and 50.3% female.  The population was made up of 96 Swiss men (49.2% of the population) and 1 (0.5%) non-Swiss men.  There were 97 Swiss women (49.7%) and 1 (0.5%) non-Swiss women.  Of the population in the municipality 78 or about 41.5% were born in Gossliwil and lived there in 2000.  There were 34 or 18.1% who were born in the same canton, while 65 or 34.6% were born somewhere else in Switzerland, and 8 or 4.3% were born outside of Switzerland.

In  there was 1 live birth to Swiss citizens and 1 death of a Swiss citizen.  Ignoring immigration and emigration, the population of Swiss citizens remained the same and the foreign population remained the same.  There was 1 Swiss man who immigrated back to Switzerland.  The total Swiss population change in 2008 (from all sources, including moves across municipal borders) was an increase of 4 and the non-Swiss population remained the same.  This represents a population growth rate of 2.0%.

The age distribution, in Gossliwil is; 22 children or 11.7% of the population are between 0 and 6 years old and 25 teenagers or 13.3% are between 7 and 19.  Of the adult population, 10 people or 5.3% of the population are between 20 and 24 years old.  60 people or 31.9% are between 25 and 44, and 39 people or 20.7% are between 45 and 64.  The senior population distribution is 24 people or 12.8% of the population are between 65 and 79 years old and  there are 8 people or 4.3% who are over 80.

, there were 79 people who were single and never married in the municipality.  There were 94 married individuals, 8 widows or widowers and 7 individuals who are divorced.

 there were 19 single family homes (or 35.2% of the total) out of a total of 54 inhabited buildings.  There were 14 multi-family buildings (25.9%), along with 19 multi-purpose buildings that were mostly used for housing (35.2%) and 2 other use buildings (commercial or industrial) that also had some housing (3.7%).

 there were 85 apartments in the municipality.  Of these apartments, a total of 74 apartments (87.1% of the total) were permanently occupied, while 7 apartments (8.2%) were seasonally occupied and 4 apartments (4.7%) were empty.  , the construction rate of new housing units was 0 new units per 1000 residents.  The vacancy rate for the municipality, was 0%.

The historical population is given in the following chart:

Politics
In the 2007 federal election the most popular party was the SVP which received 37.3% of the vote.  The next three most popular parties were the FDP (24.39%), the CVP (15.16%) and the SP (11.89%).  In the federal election, a total of 73 votes were cast, and the voter turnout was 49.3%.

Economy
, Gossliwil had an unemployment rate of 1.4%.  , there were 25 people employed in the primary economic sector and about 10 businesses involved in this sector.  2 people were employed in the secondary sector and there were 2 businesses in this sector.  6 people were employed in the tertiary sector, with 2 businesses in this sector.  There were 97 residents of the municipality who were employed in some capacity, of which females made up 42.3% of the workforce.

 the total number of full-time equivalent jobs was 19.  The number of jobs in the primary sector was 15, all of which were in agriculture.  The number of jobs in the secondary sector was 2 of which 1 was in manufacturing and 1 was in construction.  The number of jobs in the tertiary sector was 2.  In the tertiary sector; both jobs were in a hotel or restaurant.

, there were 4 workers who commuted into the municipality and 77 workers who commuted away.  The municipality is a net exporter of workers, with about 19.3 workers leaving the municipality for every one entering.  Of the working population, 5.2% used public transportation to get to work, and 72.2% used a private car.

Religion
Of the rest of the population, and there were 3 individuals (or about 1.60% of the population) who belonged to another Christian church. There were 5 (or about 2.66% of the population) who were Islamic.  24 (or about 12.77% of the population) belonged to no church, are agnostic or atheist, and 4 individuals (or about 2.13% of the population) did not answer the question.

Education
In Gossliwil about 68 or (36.2%) of the population have completed non-mandatory upper secondary education, and 27 or (14.4%) have completed additional higher education (either university or a Fachhochschule).  Of the 27 who completed tertiary schooling, 70.4% were Swiss men, 29.6% were Swiss women.

, there were 6 students in Gossliwil who came from another municipality, while 20 residents attended schools outside the municipality.

References

External links

 

Former municipalities of the canton of Solothurn
Populated places disestablished in 2014